Akbar Behkalam (born 16 September 1944) is an Iranian-born German painter and sculptor.

Biography 
Akbar Behkalam was born in Tabriz, Iran on 16 September 1944, the capital of the Iranian province East Azerbaijan. From 1961 until 1964, he studied art at Tabriz Art School. After his military service he moved to Istanbul, where he enrolled at the Mimar Sinan University in Fine Arts and became the student of professor Bedri Rahmi Eyüboğlu.

From 1972 until 1974, he lived in different European cities, including Paris, Frankfurt, Rome and Berlin. In 1974, he went back to Iran, to teach at the Tabriz Art School. In 1976, he left Iran for political reasons, and has since lived in Berlin. As of 1989, he had a studio in Brandenburg.

In 1989, he published the book, Movement and Change Paintings and Sketches: 1977–1988.

He is married to a German woman, and together they have two children.

Art 
Akbar Behkalam's early works often deal with political subjects, but over time they became increasingly abstract. His early works are influenced by the New European Realism, in a symbiosis with Persian miniature painting. His later works, up to present time can be described as abstract-expressive. A focal point of his works is the depiction of the formation and choreography of mass movements.

One recurring theme in his works is the turbulent history of his home country Iran: the series "Persepolis" (1977–1979) deals with old Persian iconography, that is confronted with the depiction of the execution squads of the Shah-regime. In the eighties he produced the series "Justice in Allah's Name", that has the religiously legitimized human rights violations of the Islamic Republic as its central theme.

From 1984-1986 Behkalam did extensive research on the German revolution of 1848 and produced several large scale paintings on that subject that were presented in his solo exhibition at the Staatliche Kunsthalle Berlin (State Art Gallery Berlin) in 1986.

Behkalam has shown his works in many exhibitions in Europe, Asia and North and South America. In 2009 he has been the winner of the Tashkent Biennial in Uzbekistan.

See also 
 Baghdad School
 Islamic art
 Iranian art
 Islamic calligraphy
 List of Iranian artists

References

Weblinks 
 Website von Akbar Behkalam

Iranian painters
Iranian emigrants to Germany
German people of Azerbaijani descent
Academy of Fine Arts in Istanbul alumni
20th-century German painters
20th-century Iranian male artists
20th-century German male artists
German male painters
21st-century German painters
21st-century Iranian male artists
21st-century German male artists
1944 births
Living people
People from Tabriz